

Results

Green denotes finalists

References

Men's 10 metre platform